The Papua New Guinea women's national field hockey team represents Papua New Guinea in international field hockey competitions and is controlled by the Papua New Guinea Hockey Federation.

Results

Oceania Cup
2007 – 4th
2013 – 4th
2017 –

Hockey World League
2012–13 – First round
2014–15 – First round
2016–17 – First round

Pacific Games
2003 – 
2007 – 
2015 –

See also

Fiji men's national field hockey team

References

Oceanian women's national field hockey teams
Field hockey
National team
Women's sport in Papua New Guinea